Down Dakota Way  is a 1949 American Trucolor Western film directed by William Witney starring Roy Rogers.

Plot
Roy Rogers is called in to investigate after the murder of a veterinarian by a rancher named McKenzie (Roy Barcroft) who is illegally selling cattle with hoof-and-mouth disease.

Cast
 Roy Rogers as Roy
 Dale Evans as Ruth Shaw
 Elisabeth Risdon as Miss Dolly Paxton
 Roy Barcroft as Mac McKenzie
 Byron Barr as Steve Paxton
 Montie Montana as Sheriff Holbrook

References

External links
 
 
 
 

1949 films
Republic Pictures films
1949 Western (genre) films
American Western (genre) films
Trucolor films
Films directed by William Witney
1940s English-language films
1940s American films